Archduchess Auguste Ferdinande of Austria (1 April 1825 – 26 April 1864) was the only daughter of Leopold II, Grand Duke of Tuscany and his first wife, Maria Anna of Saxony to survive to adulthood. She married Prince Luitpold of Bavaria, who later became the Prince Regent of Bavaria after her death.

Family

Auguste was one of three children born to Leopold II, Grand Duke of Tuscany, by his first wife, Maria Anna of Saxony. She was an older half-sister to Ferdinand IV, Grand Duke of Tuscany, among others. She was a member of the direct lineage of both Louis XIV of France and William the Conqueror.

Early life 
After a strict Catholic upbringing, she developed an interest in the arts and sciences early in life. Contemporaries described her as tall, beautiful and self-conscious.

Marriage and children 
On 15 April 1844, she married Prince Luitpold in Florence. Luitpold's father Ludwig I of Bavaria initially opposed Luitpold's marriage plans, since Auguste was already showing symptoms of pulmonary tuberculosis before the marriage (the disease of which she finally died aged only 39).

They had four children (with whom she always spoke Italian), including Ludwig III of Bavaria, and she was a great support for Luitpold in all his political activities. During the 1848 Revolution, she spoke against Lola Montez and sought to isolate opponents of the monarchy.

Her children with Luitpold were:
 Ludwig III (1845–1921), King of Bavaria, married Archduchess Maria Theresia of Austria-Este (1849–1919)
 Leopold (1846–1930), married Archduchess Gisela of Austria (1856–1932)
 Therese (1850–1925)
 Arnulf (1852–1907), married Princess Therese of Liechtenstein (1850–1938)

On her death, she was buried in the crypt of the Theatinerkirche. Luitpold never remarried, with his sister Adelgunde and daughter Therese taking over care of his household.

Ancestry

External links

1825 births
1864 deaths
House of Habsburg-Lorraine
House of Wittelsbach
19th-century deaths from tuberculosis
People of the Revolutions of 1848
Austrian princesses
Bavarian princesses
Nobility from Florence
Burials at the Theatine Church, Munich
Italian Roman Catholics
Tuberculosis deaths in Germany
Daughters of monarchs